John Poulett, 1st Earl Poulett KG (c. 1668 – 28 May 1743) was an English peer.

Life
Poulett was the son of John Poulett, 3rd Baron Poulett and his second wife, Susan Herbert, daughter of Philip Herbert, 5th Earl of Pembroke. He was the most constant patron of Thomas Gibson, a leading 18th-century artist.

Marriage & children
On 14 April 1702, he married Bridget Bertie, a granddaughter of Montagu Bertie, 2nd Earl of Lindsey, by whom he had several children:

John Poulett, 2nd Earl Poulett (1708–1764), eldest son and heir.
Peregrine Poulett (d. 1752) MP for Bridgwater
Vere Poulett, 3rd Earl Poulett (1710–1788)
Anne Poulett (1711–1785)
Bridget (1702–1773), Mrs Pollexfen Bastard
Catherine Poulett (d. 1758), mother of John Parker, 1st Baron Boringdon (1735–1788), of Saltram, Devon.
Susannah Poulett (d. 1788)
Rebecca Poulett (d. 1765)

References

1660s births
1743 deaths
Garter Knights appointed by Anne
Lord-Lieutenants of Devon
Fellows of the Royal Society
1
Burials at the Poulett mausoleum, Church of St George (Hinton St George)
John, 1st Earl